Lucirio Antonio Garrido Acosta (born 8 April 1992) is a Venezuelan middle-distance runner.

Coming from a well-known Venezuelan athletics family, he is a son of a former runner Lucirio Garrido Jr., who is also his coach, grandson of Lucirio Garrido Sr., and brother of hurdler Lucirio Francisco Garrido.

International competitions

1Did no start in the final

Personal bests
Outdoor
800 metres – 1:46.02 (Medellín 2017)
1500 metres – 3:47.35 (Barinas 2017)

References

1992 births
Living people
Venezuelan male middle-distance runners
Athletes (track and field) at the 2015 Pan American Games
Athletes (track and field) at the 2019 Pan American Games
Pan American Games competitors for Venezuela
Athletes (track and field) at the 2018 South American Games
South American Games gold medalists for Venezuela
South American Games medalists in athletics
South American Championships in Athletics winners
South American Games gold medalists in athletics
Competitors at the 2014 Central American and Caribbean Games
Competitors at the 2018 Central American and Caribbean Games
21st-century Venezuelan people